Ninia teresitae is a species of snake in the family Colubridae.  The species is native to Ecuador and Colombia.

References

Ninia
Snakes of South America
Reptiles of Ecuador
Reptiles of Colombia
Reptiles described in 2017